Uluberia College (Bengali: উলুবেড়িয়া কলেজ) is an undergraduate college in Uluberia, in Howrah district, West Bengal, India. The college is affiliated with the University of Calcutta.

History
Uluberia College was established in 1948 by educationist Haripada Ghosal, with local donations.

Departments

Science

Chemistry
Physics
Mathematics
Botany
Zoology
Physiology

Arts and Commerce

Bengali
English

History
Political Science
Philosophy
Commerce

Accreditation
Recently, Uluberia College has been re-accredited and awarded B grade by the National Assessment and Accreditation Council (NAAC). The college is also recognized by the University Grants Commission (UGC).

See also 
List of colleges affiliated to the University of Calcutta
Education in India
Education in West Bengal

References

External links

Universities and colleges in Howrah district
University of Calcutta affiliates
Educational institutions established in 1948
1948 establishments in West Bengal